South Ross Township is a township in Vermilion County, Illinois, USA.  As of the 2010 census, its population was 1,070 and it contained 445 housing units.

History
South Ross township was created in 1927.

Geography

Cities and towns
 Alvin
 Henning

Extinct towns
 Barlow Park
 Rayville
 Thomas

Adjacent townships
 Ross Township (north)
 Jordan Township, Warren County, Indiana (east)
 Steuben Township, Warren County, Indiana (east)
 Newell Township (southeast)
 Blount Township (southwest)
 Middlefork Township (west)

Cemeteries
The township contains one cemetery, Gundy.

Major highways
  U.S. Route 136
  Illinois State Route 1
  Illinois State Route 119

Demographics

References
 U.S. Board on Geographic Names (GNIS)
 United States Census Bureau cartographic boundary files

External links
 US-Counties.com
 City-Data.com
 Illinois State Archives

Townships in Vermilion County, Illinois
Townships in Illinois